Maximus of Cahors was a 6th-century bishop of Cahors, France.

He is known only as an attendee at the Fifth Council of Orléans in 549.

References 

Date of birth unknown
Date of death unknown
6th-century Frankish bishops